Sirkazhi G. Sivachidambaram is a Carnatic music vocalist and cinema playback singer from Chennai.

He is an alumnus of the Madras Medical College where he qualified as a UG & PG in Medicine and Trinity College of Music where he learnt western music. He is the principle disciple of the great master Sangeetha Vidwan Prof. B.Krishnamurthy in the intricacies and nuances of Indian Classical music, since childhood till date

He is also a Medical Doctor with a Post graduate degree in Internal Medicine. He is now working as Dean/Spl.officer, Perambalur Govt Medical college, Perambalur, Tamil Nadu on promotion from his previous designation as a Professor & HOD of Medicine in his Alma mater MMC, as Director i/c of Institute of Internal Medicine at the Madras Medical college.

Sivachidambaram is the son of Padma Shri Sirkazhi Govindarajan. Sivachidambaram has recorded a song, Enadharumai Raanuva Veerargaal, written by A. P. J. Abdul Kalam, former President of India. His extempore rendering of the song on 'Youth empowerment' in Tamil written by  Hon'ble President of India Dr. A. P. J. Abdul Kalam, during the inauguration of Tamil Isai Sangam festival in Chennai was appreciated with a hue and cry.

He was awarded the title of "Isai Peraringar" from Tamil Isai Sangam in the year 2014. In November 2015 he was appointed as the Dean of Perambalur Government Hospital in Tamil Nadu.

He has been appointed as a member of the Board of Governors in Dr. J Jayalalithaa Music and Arts University of Tamil Nadu in the year 2022, and met Hon'ble Chief Minister of Tamil Nadu M.K. Stalin, who congratulated him.

He instituted the Isaimani Dr.Seerkazhi S.Govindarajan memorial foundation, a charitable trust in memory of his father to serve the society at large with medical help, scholarships and educational aids for the unaffordable apart from taking music to inaccessible areas and exposing traditional musical wealth for all in the nook and corner of the country.

His regular Charity concerts arranged for fund raising for schools and performances in the orphanages, Senior citizen's old age homes, terminal health care centres have been appreciated by all. He has been appreciated by organisations like the Lions Club and Rotary Club with appreciatory awards for the charitable services. Endowments created by Isaimani foundation at the Thiruvannamalai Ramanashramam, Vadalur Sathyagnana sabha, Annamalai University, Madurai Tamil Isai Sangam towards annadhanam feeding and youth appreciation awards.

Awards
Sivachidambaram has received many awards including the Kalaimamani from the Tamil Nadu government, Madras Music Academy award for Best Rendering and Tamil Isai Vendar. In 2008, he received the Padma Shri award from the Government of India.
He was awarded the title of "Isai Peraringar" from Tamil Isai Sangam in the year 2014. The Tamil Nadu Dr.MGR Medical university honoured him with an Honorary doctorate D.Sc Honoris causa in appreciation of his service in the Medical field as an eminent physician and teacher of medicine. He was the recipient of the prestigious "Aryabhatta award" from Karnataka.

Discography

References

External links
 Profile at Sirkali.org
 http://www.tamilisaisangam.in/virudhukal.html

Male Carnatic singers
Carnatic singers
Living people
Recipients of the Padma Shri in arts
Singers from Chennai
Tamil singers
Alumni of Trinity College of Music
1959 births